Adamstown is a planned suburban development, the first new town in Ireland since Shannon Town in the 1960s.  Located circa 16 km from Dublin city centre, the development-in-progress is based on a 220 hectare Strategic Development Zone site south of the N4 road and Lucan, west of Liffey tributary the Griffeen River and north of the Grand Canal. No date has been set for the official granting of any specific long-term official status (as of 2020 the local authority terms it an "emerging new town") but development is underway since 2005 and as of 2015, perhaps 4,500 of a planned population of 25,000 were resident. The planned scale of development is 9,000 to 10,000 dwellings, with aligned supporting infrastructure including public transport links.  Adamstown is in the jurisdiction of South Dublin County Council.

Location and access

Adamstown is beside the Dublin-Kildare railway line, and was provided with a new, privately-funded railway station, with 5 platforms.  The settlement is just off the N4 national primary route. Weston Airport is nearby.

History

Concept and commencement
Adamstown originated with the South Dublin County Development Plan of 1998, which considered the creation of several "new towns" – only Adamstown made it to the development stage, and the area was legally designated as a Strategic Development Zone. The advance or parallel provision of a new railway station was an integral part of its development plan, together with the provision of new schools, shopping, entertainment and sporting facilities, all within walking distance in the neighbourhood, and aligned to the build-out of housing. The homes built in Adamstown were to be familiar types of houses and apartment blocks but with a layout dissimilar to other later 20th century developments in Ireland in that they were to incorporate modern urban design concepts. The development was designed to reduce car usage, with the ease of access to the train station is intended to promote walking and cycling. There was a strict limit on high-rise buildings, three to four storeys being the planned norm.

The foundation stone was laid by Taoiseach Bertie Ahern in February 2003 and infrastructure works officially commenced on 7 February 2005.  On 16 February 2006 the first houses went on the market, and the developer-funded railway station opened on 10 April 2007.

Development, delays and resumption
It was intended that after an initial ten years of development the development would have around 10,000 homes, and about 25,000 people, with schools, a library, community and healthcare centres, a cinema and a range of retail facilities.  Development slowed after the initial phases – which saw around 1,270 homes completed – partly due to the aftermath of the financial crisis, and parts of the proposed settlement remained boarded off for years. Only 20 homes were completed from 2010 to 2014, leaving a total of under 1,400 from the target 10,000 after 10 years.  The local authority applied to alter aspects of the area's development plan, and while some requests were rejected by An Bord Pleanala, target densities were reduced, as developers lobbied that apartments were not viable for sale, and some features, notably the swimming pool, were allowed to be decoupled from the phased construction of housing. Additionally, some infrastructure which had been supposed to be funded by developers was to be provided with State funding instead.

In 2015 Ulster Bank moved to sell 90% of the largely undeveloped zoned lands (with space for around 7,000 dwellings).  By then facilities comprised three schools, two shops and a hairdressing salon, along with multiple playing pitches and a park.  Development was planned and delivered with an emphasis on family safety, with enclosed green spaces overlooked by housing and wide cycle paths; mature trees were also planted.  At this time the population consisted of about 3,500 in a housing development on one side of the railway line and 1,000 in another development on the other, about 90% being private purchases, and 10% social housing clients.  A third housing development went on sale in October 2016, selling out by 2017. Further development launched in 2017.

As of mid-2020, 2,613 homes had been built, and subject to delays due to the Covid pandemic, development of thousands more were expected to proceed, with 3,500 new dwellings already covered by some form of county council permission.  The train station and three schools, a modest range of retail facilities, a community centre and an all-weather sports pitch were operating as of the same time.

Amenities
The area features a Liffey tributary stream, the Tobermaclugg, which is planned to be used as the centrepiece of a public park.

Adamstown's first neighbourhood shopping centre included a small Londis supermarket, a hair and beauty salon, and a cafe/pizzeria, situated in the Sentinel Building. Existing in the broader vicinity was a Supervalu shopping centre on Newcastle Road, while a short distance further is Lucan village. Some distance away, off the N4, is Liffey Valley shopping centre.

Education
As of 2016, there were a crèche and two primary schools, Adamstown Educate Together and St. John the Evangelist, which commenced in September 2007.  The local secondary school, Adamstown Community College, opened in September 2009, and from sixty nine students entering the school it had around 870 by 2015. The school crest, of a castle, originates from an old castle that use to stand where the current school stands today. The secondary school is operated by the County of Dublin VEC.

Sport
Adamstown has a soccer club, Adamstown Football Club, and a GAA club, Adamstown GAA club, for both girls and boys, including hurling and camogie groups. Adamstown Football Club was established in November 2005 and plays in the United Churches League, with two teams (as of 2008). The GAA club was authorised on 11 June 2007 at a meeting of the Dublin County Board.  There are also Adamstown Cricket Club, and a cycling club.  A new structure, Club Adamstown, was being put in place as of 2020 by the local council to offer sporting opportunities, including expanded cricketing, to local children.

Recognition

Sustainable Communities Award 2009 
In February 2009, Adamstown, the new neighbourhood being built on the west side of Dublin, won a "Sustainable Communities" award from the UK's Royal Town Planning Institute. It was the only non-UK project to pick up a prize at the annual awards ceremony and was entered by South Dublin County Council and Chartridge, the developers (comprising Castlethorn Construction, Maplewood Homes and Tierra Construction). The award recognises that Adamstown has been properly planned and balances living accommodation with infrastructure, such as shops, cinema, train station, swimming pool, library, health centres, restaurants, schools, mixed places of worship and parks, among other facilities. Adamstown is Ireland's first Strategic Development Zone, which means that the construction of homes runs in tandem with such facilities. The judges praised the design and layout of Adamstown for its "modern vernacular" and said it would be a "model for development elsewhere".

See also
 List of towns and villages in Ireland

References

External links
Official site
Adamstown Railway Station Roof Construction
BBC report on Adamstown, May 2012

Towns and villages in South Dublin (county)
New towns in the Republic of Ireland
Populated places established in the 2000s